International Voluntary Services (IVS) was an American private nonprofit 501(c)3 organization that placed volunteers in humanitarian and development projects overseas. It operated from its founding in 1953 to its dissolution in 2002. It placed volunteers in 39 countries in Asia, Africa, and Latin America, with its largest and longest programs in South Vietnam, Laos, Algeria, and Bangladesh. Despite the organization's roots in Christian pacifism, it operated on a nonsectarian basis, accepting volunteers regardless of their religious beliefs. Over its lifetime, the IVS program evolved from placement of American volunteers to placement of internationally recruited volunteers and then to recruitment of local and regional volunteers.

Founding of International Voluntary Services (IVS) 
IVS was founded and its organization and program heavily influenced by: 1) staff of the new U.S, foreign assistance agency in 1953; ii) private individuals from traditional peace churches and other groups; and iii) its first Executive Director.

The 1948 Marshall Plan for direct U.S. assistance to Europe for recovery after World War II proved highly successful. President Truman in his 1949 inauguration speech proposed to extend the Marshall Plan concept with a “Four Point” program, including an ambitious fourth point for “a bold new program for making the benefits of our scientific advances and industrial progress available for the improvement and growth of underdeveloped areas.” A Technical Cooperation Administration (TCA) was charged with implementing this program.

Two men in the newly created TCA, Stanley Andrews and Dale D. Clarke, saw the potential to tap talents of the religious community for the new initiative. Andrews identified about 75 religious organizations with programs around the world that understood local conditions and were supported by American citizens were willing to work for the common good. He felt they could come together to form a non-profit organization to send young people out to work in village development activities. Andrews also recognized the need to assist in bringing such an organization into reality and assigned Dale Clark to this task.

Clark accepted this assignment and met with an interested group that included: Mennonite Central Committee representative William Snyder, W. Harold Row of the Brethren Service Committee, and Benjamin Bushong, Director of the Brethren’s Heifer Project. Clark outlined the concept and arranged an initial planning meeting. At that planning meeting, Clark stressed the need for an interdenominational approach adapted to needs of the Point Four Program and provided the group with a copy of the Near East Foundation charter to use as a model.  

An initial IVS preparatory committee meeting on July 8, 1953 reviewed the concepts for the new organization, reaffirming that IVS would be a “people-to-people” program where local people were participants in IVS projects and not just recipients of foreign assistance and that it should remain independent and private in nature. IVS’s corporate charter, dated February 16, 1953, stated as its first objective “to utilize the services of volunteers on an organized basis to combat hunger, poverty, disease, and illiteracy in the underdeveloped areas of the world and thereby further the peace, happiness and prosperity of the peoples thereof.”

An Operations Advisory Committee (OAC) was set up to guide institutional and program development. In addition to Row, Snyder, and Bushong, this included: Roy A. Burkhart of World Neighbors, John H. Reisner of Agricultural Missions, Inc. and former dean of an agricultural college in China, Franklin S. Harris of Salt Lake City, E.B. Evans of Prairie View A & M College, Captain William H. Tuck, director general of international refugees during World War II, Carl C. Taylor of the Ford Foundation, and Margaret Hickey, an attorney, journalist, women's right's activist (to be confirmed). While a diverse group, key leadership and program design came from representatives of three traditional “peace churches”: the Religious Society of Friends (Quakers), the Mennonites, and the Church of the Brethren. Because the three churches opposed war, as an alternative to military service, their members served in various voluntary roles without being combatants. This and their humanitarian service ethic gave them a wealth of experience in international work, experience that proved very relevant to the IVS agenda.

Managing the fledgling IVS organization fell to its first Executive Director, John S. Noffsinger, who assumed the position in 1953 and served until he left to work at the new Peace Corps in 1961. Noffsinger had spent two years assigned to a town in the far northeastern province of Cagayan of the Philippines under an American colonial program to establish a Philippine public education system. This program relied on youthful American teachers that came to be called “Thomasites” after the ship, the USS Thomas, that brought about 500 of these young Americans to Manila in 1901. After his two years in the Philippines, Noffsinger received a Ph.D. in Education from Columbia University and spent his adult working life in education. He had retired by 1953 but retained a desire to assist people overseas. His experience as a teacher in the Philippines and as an educator were foundational in his shaping the IVS, and later the Peace Corps, programs.

1st Decade Program (1953–1962) 

With this declaration, IVS was founded in 1953    by Mennonite, Brethren and Quaker organizations.  It began a 50-year history of international development.  The first project was when two young men were sent to Egypt to help improve poultry and dairy farming among the farmers of Assiut.

An office was opened in Iraq, and teams worked in village sanitation, nursing, home construction, and agriculture.  In Nepal, a training school was set up for local community development workers.  In Liberia, a large team of teachers taught at the elementary level.  And in Vietnam, a very successful resettlement and agricultural development was begun.  Other country locations that were started in this period were Jordan, Cambodia, Laos, and Ghana.

2nd Decade Program (1963–1972) 
Vietnam and Laos were main focuses of the IVS program during this period, and although all programs in southeast Asia were closed by the mid-1970s, approximately 800 volunteers had served there in the proceeding 20 years.  Groups here worked in both rural and urban settings and by the late 1960s had become entangled in the turmoil of the Vietnam war.  Eleven volunteers were killed or died in accidents during this period and three were captured and imprisoned by the North Vietnamese.

The first volunteer to lose his life was Peter M. Hunting, a 1963 Wesleyan University graduate, who was killed in an ambush in the Mekong Delta in 1965. He is the subject of a memoir and magazine article by his sister, the author and radio essayist Jill Hunting. Jill Hunting writes in her memoir that volunteers in the Vietnam war zone were aware of the risks they took, with one volunteer reporting "thirty different attempts on his life that he never mentioned to anyone while he was in Vietnam."

In addition, there were programs in Syria, Gaza, Algeria, Sabah, Sudan, Morocco, Zaire, Libya, and Yemen.

3rd Decade Program (1973–1982) 
By 1975, all volunteers had been pulled out of mainland southeast Asia.  This ended the "Indochina" period of IVS.  This change was followed by expansion in other regions around the world.  In Bangladesh, volunteer teams worked with agriculture, silviculture, and horticulture, as well as health and family planning.  Disaster relief became important later in the program.  A clean water project was undertaken in Madagascar, and IVS moved into Latin America.  Locations included Ecuador, Bolivia, Indonesia, Colombia, Mauritania, Papua New Guinea, Botswana, and Honduras.

4th Decade Program (1983–1992) 
This period of IVS saw a transition from an earlier model where young people from North America were sent all over the world, to one where a smaller number of professionals were placed in locations.  In some regions, skilled and educated locals, whose skills were not being utilized due to underemployment, were recruited to volunteer in the program.  By the 1990s over 80% of IVS staff and volunteers were host country nationals or internationals.  In addition, IVS began working with other aid organizations in regions, supplying volunteers to these existing programs.

Programs that began during this time period include Zimbabwe, the Caribbean, Ethiopia, Cape Verde, Mali, and an HIV/AIDS education program among sex workers in Thailand, Vietnam, and Cambodia.

5th Decade Program (1993–2002) 
Financial concerns became severe during this period, ultimately forcing the organization to close.  Several changes were made to avoid this, such as restructuring to work in partnership with other PVO organizations, placing self-funded volunteers in other national NGO organizations, and nearly abandoning the original vision of grassroots volunteerism to fund and support foreign organizations.

When the eventuality of closing IVS became unavoidable, the organization committed itself to establishing its remaining operating programs in Bolivia, Ecuador, and Bangladesh as national NGOs.  This goal was achieved with the creation of Fundacion Mingo/IVS and IVS Bangladesh.  The Caribbean program had already converted to this model in 1984, to form Caribbean Advisory and Professional Services.

Finances

Although IVS was private, it accepted financing for some of its projects from the United States Agency for International Development (USAID) and its predecessors, the United States Technical Cooperation Administration and the United States International Cooperation Administration.  While steps were taken to broaden the financial base, this dependency became a critical problem later in the organization's history.  The organization never developed a strong fiscal support system.

During the fifth decade, financial difficulties increased.  The Cooperative Agreement with USAID ended, significantly reducing the amount of money coming in through grants.  Later, when USAID policy changed to fund programs based in foreign countries, rather than Washington, D.C., even less financial support was coming to IVS.

People

Anthony Lake, who became executive director of UNICEF in 2010, served briefly as head of IVS in the 1970s. Wendy Chamberlin was an IVS instructor at the College of Education in Laos during the early 1970s. She went on to become the U. S. Ambassador to Laos and to Pakistan, and is currently the President of the Middle East Institute.

One of the most notable IVS volunteers was Edgar "Pop" Buell, a farmer from Steuben County, Indiana, who volunteered to work in agricultural development projects in Laos in 1960. Buell later became a senior USAID official in Laos and managed humanitarian relief to the Hmong people during the "Secret War" in which the Hmong, with backing from the United States Central Intelligence Agency, fought communist Pathet Lao forces.

In 1967, four senior IVS staff members in Vietnam, including country director Don Luce, resigned to protest American policy in the Vietnam War, which they believed undermined the humanitarian work that IVS was trying to carry out.  The four also drafted a letter to President Lyndon B. Johnson calling the war "an overwhelming atrocity."  Signed by 49 IVS volunteers and staff members, the letter received front-page coverage in the New York Times.

Thomas C. Fox, IVS volunteer (’66-’68, Vietnam) wrote about his experiences as a volunteer in Tuy Hoa, Vietnam on Jan. 2, 2018 the “New York Times “67” newsletter. In a first person article entitled “The Camps,” Fox outlined the neglect and poverty he found in the Ninh Tinh and Dong Tac camps for the war displaced farmers. He wrote about the difficulties he faced getting subsistence supplies to these Vietnamese. Fox was one of the signers of the 1967 IVS protest letter and accompanied Don Luce to the US Embassy in Saigon to deliver the letter to then US Ambassador to Vietnam, Ellsworth Bunker.

In 1971, two IVS volunteers in Vietnam, Alexander D. Shimkin and Ronald Moreau, were terminated by the organization when they became sources for a New York Times story by Gloria Emerson about the forced use of Vietnamese civilians by South Vietnamese officers and their American advisers to clear land mines near the village of Ba Chúc.  Shimkin was killed the following year while covering the war for Newsweek.  Moreau later became Newsweek's Bureau Chief for Southeast Asia and South Asia. He died in 2014.

Legacy

IVS was dissolved in 2002. It is considered a precursor to the Peace Corps. The archives of IVS are at the Mennonite Church USA Archives.  Archival materials of Charles F. Sweet, an IVS volunteer who served in Vietnam during wartime, are available at Cornell University Library in its Division of Rare and Manuscript Collections.

Notes and references

Further reading
Winburn T. Thomas, The Vietnam Story of International Voluntary Services, Inc., Washington, D.C.: International Voluntary Services, Inc., June 30, 1972, Typed report prepared for USAID, 302 pages.(PDF file)

External links
 The papers of Don Cohon at Dartmouth College Library
 International Volunteers - Hovos
Author Jill Hunting reads from her book, Finding Pete, about her brother who was killed in Vietnam as an IVS volunteer in 1965.

Organizations established in 1953
International volunteer organizations
Organizations disestablished in 2002